Lock, Stock... is a seven-part British television crime drama series, co-written and created by Guy Ritchie, as a spin-off from his 1998 film Lock, Stock and Two Smoking Barrels. The series first broadcast on Channel 4 on 29 May 2000 with a feature-length pilot, Lock, Stock and Four Stolen Hooves.

The series stars Daniel Caltagirone, Del Synnott, Scott Maslen and Shaun Parkes as close friends Moon, Jamie, Bacon and Lee, who run The Lock, a public house in London. Each episode focuses on the four friends attempting a different business venture, and the comedy of errors that ensues. Ralph Brown also stars as local gangland boss Miami Vice.

Production
Lock, Stock... was Ginger Productions' first commission for television. The series prominently featured the use of the rhyming slang of London's East End, making it harder for some viewers to comprehend. In Australia, the series first aired in 2001 on ABC. In Portugal, the series first aired in 2005 on cable channel SIC Radical. In Germany, the series first aired on cable channel RTL Crime in 2011, under the title  Bube, Dame, König, grAS  (which in turn, is the German title of Lock, Stock and Two Smoking Barrels).

Release
A soundtrack album featuring music used in the series was issued on 9 June 2000 via Virgin Records. The complete series was released on DVD Universal Studios for Region 2 on 4 December 2000. The series was later released by Siren Visual Entertainment for Region 4 in Australia. The series is also available to purchase as a box-set on iTunes.

Cast

Main cast
 Ralph Brown as Miami Vice, a local crime boss.
 Daniel Caltagirone as Moon, a chef and electronics expert.
 Scott Maslen as Jamie, a fast talker.
 Shaun Parkes as Bacon, who makes sure things run smoothly, or at least tries to.
 Del Synnott as Lee, a ladies man, who always has sex on his mind.
 Christopher Adamson as Three Feet, an enforcer working for Miami Vice.
 Lorraine Chase as Barbie
 Lisa Rogers as Tanya, a dancer at Lapland.

Recurring cast
 Mario Kalli as Kouros; proprietor of the Trojan Kebab House.
 George Antoni as Nefarious; a Cypriot who deals in anything shady from the back of the Trojan Kebab House.
 Martin Freeman as Jaap; a Dutch drug taker and general idiot.
 Chris Rowe as Johan
 Nicki Grosse as Laura
 Nikolaj Coster-Waldau as Jordi
 Nick Brimble as Uncle Derek
 Ian Brimble as Uncle Brian

Episodes

References

External links

2000s British crime television series
2000 British television series debuts
2000 British television series endings
Channel 4 original programming
British crime television series
Ginger Productions
Live action television shows based on films